The 6th Artistic Gymnastics World Championships were held in Paris, France, on the occasion of the 40th anniversary of the "Union des Societes des Gymnastique de France", on November 16, 1913.

Medal table 

Note
Official FIG documents credit medals earned by athletes from Bohemia as medals for Czechoslovakia.

Team all-around

Individual all-around

Pommel horse

Rings

Parallel bars

Horizontal bar

References 

World Artistic Gymnastics Championships
International gymnastics competitions hosted by France
World Artistic Gymnastics Championships, 1913
G
Gymnastics in Paris